THX JHN is the third studio album by Johan released on May 22, 2006. The previous album, Pergola, was released five years earlier. Like all Johan albums, it is released on the Excelsior Recordings label.

Track listing
 "Coming In From The Cold"
 "Oceans"
 "Walking Away"
 "She's Got A Way With Men"
 "Reader Takes A Stand"  
 "Tonight"
 "When I'm On My Own"
 "Any Other Guy" 
 "Out Of Reach"       
 "Staring At The Sun"
 "You Know"

Johan (band) albums
2006 albums